State Security Service Academy of Azerbaijan named after Heydar Aliyev (Azerbaijani: Dövlət Təhlükəsizliyi Xidmətinin Heydər Əliyev adına Akademiyası) is a higher military educational institution that provides professional training of personnel of the State Security Service and the Foreign Intelligence Service, training of highly qualified specialists, as well as border controllers and border guard officers for the State Border Service.

History 
The Academy was established by decree of President of Azerbaijan Heydar Aliyev on December 1, 1998.

The Academy was named after Heydar Aliyev by decree of President of Azerbaijan Ilham Aliyev dated December 20, 2005. It used to operate under the Ministry of National Security of Azerbaijan, and since December 2015, it has been operating under the State Security Service.

The main goal of the institution is to train highly qualified personnel for national security agencies. Practical and theoretical management of the scientific and educational activities of the Academy is carried out by the Scientific Council.

Faculties 

 Faculty of Border Troops
 Faculty of Training of Operational Workers
 Faculty of Retraining and Advanced Training.

See also 
 State Security Service of the Republic of Azerbaijan

References 

Military academies of Azerbaijan
1998 establishments in Azerbaijan